Lesbian, gay, bisexual, and transgender (LGBT) rights in the U.S. state of Washington have evolved significantly since the late 20th century. Same-sex sexual activity was legalized in 1976. LGBT people are fully protected from discrimination in the areas of employment, housing and public accommodations; the state enacting comprehensive anti-discrimination legislation regarding sexual orientation and gender identity in 2006. Same-sex marriage has been legal since 2012, and same-sex couples are allowed to adopt. Conversion therapy on minors has also been illegal since 2018.
	
Washington is frequently referred to as one of the United States' most LGBT-friendly states, and its largest city Seattle has a thriving LGBT community, ranked as the fifth largest in the country. Opinion polling has shown that a majority of Washingtonians support same-sex marriage and LGBT rights. A 2019 survey from the Public Religion Research Institute showed that 74% of residents supported anti-discrimination laws protecting LGBT people. In November 2012, voters approved a same-sex marriage law in Referendum 74.

History
Several Native American tribes in modern-day Washington recognize individuals who act, behave and live as the opposite gender, now referred to as "two-spirit". Among the Quileute people, such individuals are known as yah'wa. After being created from the northern portion of the Oregon Territory in 1853, the newly-created Washington Territory adopted all its laws from Oregon. At the time, the Oregon Territory did not criminalize sodomy (it did, however, enact a sodomy law later that year). The Washington Territory thus did not possess a sodomy law at its creation, nor did it ever pass one later on; the Washington Territory being one of the few United States territories never to criminalize sodomy. In 1893, shortly after statehood, in the case of State v. Place, the Washington Supreme Court took note of the absence of a sodomy law. The Washington State Legislature acted swiftly, enacting Washington's first ever sodomy law only 19 days after the Place ruling. It prohibited "crimes against nature" with ten to fourteen years' imprisonment. Over the following years, the courts convicted multiple people of sodomy, though also rejected some cases due to lack of evidence. As was the case for sodomy laws around the country at the time, the law punished both heterosexual and homosexual conduct and criminalized fellatio (oral sex) and anal intercourse.

Washington enacted a sterilization law in 1909, permitting "habitual criminals" to be forcefully sterilized. The only known person to be sterilized under the law was a (heterosexual) man in 1912 accused of statutory rape, though he was later found innocent of the crime. The law was amended in 1921, providing for the "possible sterilization of [...] moral degenerates and sexual perverts". The Washington Supreme Court struck down the law as unconstitutional in 1942, holding that the "mental condition [of the accused] did not allow them fully to understand the nature of the notice". Those convicted of sodomy were further defined as "sexual psychopaths" under a 1949 psychopathic offender law. In 1953, the Supreme Court ruled that non-penetrative sex could not be considered sodomy, and in 1967, in the case of State v. Rhinehart, upheld the sodomy law as constitutional. The defendant, Keith Rhinehart, challenged the law as a violation of his right to privacy and on the grounds of vagueness and the establishment of religion, though the Court held that these contentions had "no merit". In 1972, a same-sex couple holding hands at a Seattle skating rink were arrested, resulting in protests and renewed debate surrounding the sodomy law.

In 2020, the Washington State Legislature established an LGBT coordinator within the Washington Department of Veterans Affairs. The legislation to this effect also allows LGBT veterans who received a dishonorable discharge under Don't Ask, Don't Tell to have that discharge changed, and ensures that those veterans and their families have access to veteran benefits.

Legality of same-sex sexual activity
Washington repealed its laws that criminalized consensual sodomy in June 1975, effective on July 1, 1976. Initially, the age of consent was different for heterosexual and homosexual conduct, though was unified in 1988 at 16.

Recognition of same-sex relationships

Since 2001, Washington state has provided benefits to same-sex partners of state employees.

The state adopted a statute defining marriage as the union of a man and a woman in 1998. In the 2006 case of Andersen v. King County, the Washington Supreme Court upheld the constitutionality of that law. Since 2007, Washington state has recognized its own state-registered domestic partnerships, which are considered equivalent to the domestic partnerships, civil unions, and marriages of same-sex couples in other jurisdictions. It has also recognized same-sex civil unions and domestic partnerships established in other jurisdictions since then.

Since 2011, Washington state has recognized same-sex marriages performed elsewhere as the equivalent of its own domestic partnerships.

Governor Chris Gregoire signed a law authorizing same-sex marriages on February 13, 2012, but opponents gathered enough signatures to force a voter referendum on the legislation. Voters approved the law in the November election by a margin of 54% to 46%. Same-sex marriages have been recognized by the state since that law took effect on December 6. The law also provided that Washington's registered domestic partnerships convert automatically to marriages on June 30, 2014, if not dissolved before that date.

Federal income tax
The Internal Revenue Service ruled in May 2010 that its rules governing communal property income for married couples extend to couples who file taxes in a community property state that recognizes domestic partnerships or same-sex marriages. Couples with registered domestic partnerships in Washington, a community property state, must first combine their annual income and then each must claim half that amount as his or her income for federal tax purposes. However, filing such returns precludes electronic filing, and Washington has no state income tax independently justifying a complex filing. In certain circumstances, the IRS allows affected couples to disregard community property rules. Since April 2011, Washington has recognized same-sex marriages performed in other jurisdictions as equivalent to its domestic partnerships, with the result that community property rules now apply to these couples as well, when residing in Washington.

Adoption and parenting
Washington state law permits a legally competent adult to petition to adopt without respect to marital status. Same-sex couples can adopt jointly and can arrange second-parent adoptions as well.

Lesbian couples are allowed to access in vitro fertilisation. State law recognizes the non-genetic, non-gestational mother as a legal parent to a child born via donor insemination, irrespective of the marital status of the parents. Commercial surrogacy has been legal in Washington since January 1, 2019. Couples, regardless of their gender, marital status or sexual orientation, may undertake surrogacy arrangements.

Previously, the state recognized and enforced custody decrees from other countries in child custody cases–even if those decrees stemmed from foreign laws criminalizing homosexuality. In April 2021, a bill passed the Washington State Legislature (passing the House by a vote of 96–2 and the Senate by 49 votes to 0) to protect families from facing the death penalty in certain foreign jurisdictions on the basis of their religious beliefs, political beliefs or sexual orientation. The legislation allows the state to ignore state law if it would subject parents and children to such foreign laws. Governor Jay Inslee signed the bill into law on April 14.

Discrimination protections

Washington state law prohibits discrimination based on sexual orientation and gender identity or expression. The protections were added in 2006 with Washington House Bill 2661, signed into law by Governor Christine Gregoire, a member of the Democratic Party. Discrimination based on sexual orientation in state employment had already been prohibited since 1991 by an executive order of Governor Booth Gardner.

Moreover, the state's anti-bullying law prohibits bullying on the basis of sex, race, creed, religion, color, national origin, sexual orientation, gender expression, gender identity, honorably discharged veteran or military status, presence of any sensory, mental or physical disability, or use of a trained dog guide or service animal. The law also explicitly includes cyberbullying and harassment, and applies to all public schools and public charter schools.

On March 7, 2014, Mark Zmuda filed a lawsuit in King County Superior Court against Eastside Catholic School and the Archdiocese of Seattle charging illegal termination of his employment as an assistant principal and swimming coach at the school in December 2013 after his same-sex marriage entered into the previous July became known to school officials. The Archdiocese was named as a defendant because it has no direct authority over the school but, according to the complaint, ordered his dismissal.

Arlene's Flowers in Richland was fined $1,000 in February 2015 for violating the state's anti-discrimination law for refusing to provide flowers for a same-sex wedding. In February 2017, the fine was unanimously upheld by the Washington Supreme Court, which held that the florist had no right under the U.S. Constitution's Free Exercise Clause or Free Speech Cause to refuse services to the couple due to her religious beliefs.

Washington state LGBTQ commission
In April 2019, the Washington State Legislature passed a bill to establish the Washington state LGBTQ commission, which will "work with state agencies to develop and implement policies to address the needs of the community". The bill passed the House by a vote of 67–28 and the Senate by a vote of 30–16. The Governor signed the bill into law on May 13, 2019 and it went into effect on July 28, 2019.

Washington State hospitals
Since July 1, 2021, all hospitals within Washington State under a state law enacted require "clear demographics and/or characteristics information profiles of any individuals included within healthcare databases" - that explicitly lists both sexual orientation and gender identity. California has very similar legislation enacted.

2013 Florist Washington state case
In November 2021, the "florist famous case" was dropped with a settlement agreed to by all parties involved. The florist will pay damages to the same-sex couple affected. The lawsuit was established in 2013.

Hate crime law
Washington state law criminalizes "malicious harassment" and violence motivated by the victim's sexual orientation or gender identity and expression.

Gay panic defense
In February 2020, the Washington State Legislature passed a bill, by a vote of 90–5 in the House and 46–3 in the Senate, to abolish the gay panic defense. The bill was signed into law in March 2020 by Governor Jay Inslee, and went into effect in June 2020.

Transgender rights

In order for a transgender person in Washington to change the gender marker on their birth certificate, they must submit to the Washington State Department of Health a completed "Request to Change Sex Designation on a Birth Certificate for an Adult" form, signed in front of a notary. If the applicant is a minor, they must fill out a "Request to Change Sex Designation on a Birth Certificate for a Minor" signed by a parent or legal guardian and a health care/mental health care provider. The department will change the sex designation to "M" (male), "F" (female) or "X" upon request of the applicant. The State Department of Licensing will issue a driver's license or state ID with a gender marker of "M", "F" or "X" upon receipt of a completed "Change of Gender Designation Request" form signed by the applicant. Sex reassignment surgery is not a legal requirement to change the gender marker on official documents. Surgery, puberty blockers, hormone replacement therapy and other transition-related healthcare for transgender people is covered under health insurance and state Medicard policies.

Transgender people in Washington are allowed to use restrooms that correspond with their gender identity. In February 2016, the Washington State Senate voted 24–25 to reject a bill that would have repealed a new rule issued by the state's Human Rights Commission that allows transgender people to use public restrooms that correspond with their gender identity. One Democrat voted in favor of repealing the new rule, while 3 Republicans voted against repealing it. Following the bill's defeat, supporters began collecting signatures to have the issue placed on the ballot in November 2016. However, in July, it was revealed that not enough signatures had been collected.

Since January 27, 2018, the Washington State Department of Health has allowed people to register their sex as "X" on birth certificates. A similar option on driver's licenses became available on November 13, 2019.

Seattle allows single occupant restrooms in city facilities and public places to be used by any person, regardless of sex or gender identity.

Since January 1, 2022 under the "Gender Affirming Treatment Act" in Washington State will legally cover sex reassignment surgery for insurance purposes under Medicaid. Also the same law removes "parental permission" for sex reassignment surgery on teenagers in Washington State.

Conversion therapy

On February 13, 2014, the Washington House of Representatives voted 94–4 in favor of a bill that would have prohibited health care providers from trying to change the sexual orientation of minors. The state Senate, controlled by the Majority Coalition Caucus, took no action on the legislation.

Another bill was introduced in 2015. It passed the Senate in March. The House then approved a modified version of the bill in a 60–37 vote. However, in April, the Senate voted 27–22 to refuse to consider the modified bill.

After Democrats took control of the Washington Senate at the end of 2017, legislation (known as Senate Bill 5722) banning conversion therapy was approved 32–16, with 1 "excused from the chamber" (due to disorderly conduct) on January 19, 2018. The bill then passed the state House of Representatives by a vote of 66–32, and had to go back to the Senate for another vote due to some amendments. The Senate later passed the amended bill by a vote of 33–16. Governor Jay Inslee signed it into law on March 28, 2018. The law went into effect 90 days after the end of the legislative term (i.e. June 7, 2018).

Local bans
On August 1, 2016, Seattle voted to ban conversion therapy on minors. Councilmember Lorena González sponsored the ban, and it was unanimously approved by all other eight city councilmembers. Mayor Ed Murray signed the ordinance on August 3 and it took effect on October 2, 2016.

Court challenge rejected
In August 2021, courts rejected the challenge to the legal ban on conversion therapy within Washington State.

Public opinion
A 2017 Public Religion Research Institute poll found that 73% of Washington residents supported same-sex marriage, while 21% were opposed and 6% were unsure.

Summary table

See also
 Law of Washington (state)
 LGBT rights in the United States

References

Rights
Washington
Politics of Washington (state)
Washington (state) law